Andrew Fitzgerald (3 December 1885 - 24 November 1969) was an Irish hurler. At club level he played with Blackrock and was also a member of the Cork senior hurling team. He usually lined out as a goalkeeper.

Career
Fitzgerald first came to prominence at club level with Blackrock. After establishing himself as goalkeeper on the club's senior team, he went on to win three County Championship titles in four years. Fitzgerald's performances at club level saw him being selected for the Cork senior hurling team and he made his first appearance in the 1909 Munster final defeat by Tipperary. He also lined out in the 1912 All-Ireland final defeat by Kilkenny, having earlier claimed his only senior silverware when Cork won the Munster Championship title. Fitzgerald's last game for Cork was an All-Ireland semi-final defeat of Galway in 1914.

Personal life and death
Kelleher was born in Geraldine Place, Ballintemple in December 1885, the fifth of eight surviving children of Edward and Anne Fitzgerald (née Donoghue). The family were reasonably well-off and he trained as a mechanical engineer. Fitzgerald married Margaret Barry-Murphy in Cloughduv in 1916. Her elder brother, Barry Murphy, was a contemporary of Fitzgerald on the Cork team while her other brothers, John Barry-Murphy and Dinny Barry-Murphy, also lined out with Cork.

Fitzgerald died at his home in Victoria Road, Cork after a period of ill health on 24 November 1969.

Career statistics

Honours
Blackrock
Cork Senior Hurling Championship: 1910, 1912, 1913

Cork
Munster Senior Hurling Championship: 1912

References

1885 births
1969 deaths
Blackrock National Hurling Club hurlers
Cork inter-county hurlers
Hurling goalkeepers
Mechanical engineers